The Ruan Center is a high-rise office building located at 666 Grand Avenue in Des Moines, Iowa, which was built by Ruan Transportation. The building was completed in 1975 and stands at a height of 459.68 ft (140m), and was the tallest building in Iowa until the completion of 801 Grand in 1991. The south side of the building's site was formerly occupied by The Chamberlain Hotel.

The Ruan Center is locally known as the "rusty skyscraper", for its Cor-Ten steel cladding that sheds rust. The exterior skin is composed of 1,600 US tons of Cor-Ten steel, and 4,700 tons of structural steel were used in the building's frame.

The building consists mainly of office space and is connected to Des Moines' skywalk system. The 33rd and 34th floors are home to the Des Moines Club, a private members-only restaurant.

The Ruan Center was named one of the 50 Most Significant Iowa Buildings of the 20th Century by the Iowa chapter of the American Institute of Architects.

See also
 List of tallest buildings in Iowa

References

External links
 Ruan Website

Office buildings completed in 1975
Skyscraper office buildings in Des Moines, Iowa
Modernist architecture in Iowa
1975 establishments in Iowa